The Focke-Wulf Fw 44 Stieglitz ("Goldfinch") is a 1930s German two-seat biplane. An early design by Kurt Tank, it was produced by the Focke-Wulf company as a pilot training and sports flying aircraft. It was also built under license in several other countries.

Design and development
The Fw 44 was designed as a biplane with conventional layout and straight, untapered wings. Its two open cockpits were arranged in tandem, and both cockpits were equipped with flight controls and instruments. The Fw 44 had fixed tailwheel landing gear. It employed ailerons on both upper and lower wings. It did not use flaps. It was flown with a Siemens-Halske Sh 14 radial engine.

The first prototype flew in 1932. After many tests and modifications to increase the plane's durability and aerodynamics, the final Fw 44 proved to have excellent airworthiness.

A second version of the Fw 44 was the Fw 44B, which had an Argus As 8 four-cylinder inverted inline air-cooled engine of 90 kW (120 hp). The cowling for this engine gave the plane a more slender, aerodynamic nose.

Twenty Fw 44s purchased by China were modified for combat missions, and participated in the early stage of the Second Sino-Japanese War until all were lost in action.

The last series version was the Fw 44J, which was sold or built under license in several countries around the world. It was equipped with a seven-cylinder Siemens-Halske Sh 14 radial engine.

Variants

Fw 44B

Fw 44C
Main production version with minor equipment changes, powered by a seven-cylinder Siemens-Halske Sh 14a radial piston engine.
Fw 44D

Fw 44E

Fw 44F

Fw 44J
Final production model, powered by a seven-cylinder Siemens-Halske Sh 14a radial piston engine.

Operators

Argentine Air Force
Argentine Naval Aviation
The aircraft was produced under license in 1937–1942 period

Austrian Air Force (1927-1938) – license production

Bolivian Air Force – one aircraft was delivered in November 1937

Brazilian Air Force
Brazilian Naval Aviation
– license production

Bulgarian Air Force – license production

Republic of China Air Force

Chilean Air Force – 15 aircraft delivered in February 1938

Colombian Air Force

Czechoslovakian Air Force (Postwar)

Suomen Ilmavoimat

Luftwaffe

Hungarian Air Force

Polish Air Force

Royal Romanian Air Force

Slovak Air Force (1939–45)

Spanish Air Force

Swedish Air Force – license production

Swiss Air Force
  (1937–1962)

SFR Yugoslav Air Force – Postwar.

Specifications

Notes

Bibliography

Further reading

External links

 Musee volant de l'Amicale Jean-Baptiste Salis
 Commemorative Air Force
 Biplanes.de's Fw 44 D-EMMI Stieglitz Photo Page (in German)
 YouTube's D-EMMI Stieglitz Takeoff at Eisenhardt airshow in 2010
 Biplanes.de's 85th Anniversary of Focke-Wulf's founding Stieglitz Fly-In Page (in German)

Fw 044
1930s German military trainer aircraft
World War II trainer aircraft of Germany
Biplanes
Single-engined tractor aircraft
Aircraft first flown in 1932
Parasite aircraft